Safta Brâncoveanu (1776–1857) was a Romanian noblewoman and philanthropist.

Biography 
She was the daughter of Teodor Balș and Zoe Rosetti-Balș and married in 1793 to Grigore Brâncoveanu, lord of Craiova. She became famed as a great benefactor of hospitals, monasteries, churches and charitable projects. After being widowed in 1832, she withdrew with her mother to Văratec Monastery, where she became a nun in 1840. In 1835–38, she founded the famous charity hospital Spitalul Brâncovenesc for the poor in Bucharest.

References
 Constantin, Gane (1976). Trecute vieti de doamne si domnițe. p. 322

19th-century Romanian people
1776 births
1857 deaths
Romanian philanthropists
19th-century Romanian women
18th-century Romanian women